Simply Fortran is an Integrated Development Environment (IDE) for FORTRAN 77, Fortran 90, Fortran 95, Fortran 2003 and Fortran 2008. The project is maintained by the company Approximatrix, LLC.

See also

 Comparison of integrated development environments
 KDevelop

References

External links
 

Fortran
Integrated development environments
Linux integrated development environments
Windows integrated development environments